Neoguraleus lineatus is an extinct species of sea snail, a marine gastropod mollusk in the family Mangeliidae.

Description
The length of this very small shell attains 4.5 mm, its diameter 2.5 mm.

Distribution
This extinct marine species is endemic to New Zealand and occurs in Tertiary strata on Pitt Island

References

 Marwick, J. "The Tertiary Mollusca of the Chatham Islands including a generic revision of the New Zealand Pectinidae." Transactions of the New Zealand institute. Vol. 58. No. 4. 1928
 Maxwell, P.A. (2009). Cenozoic Mollusca. pp 232–254 in Gordon, D.P. (ed.) New Zealand inventory of biodiversity. Volume one. Kingdom Animalia: Radiata, Lophotrochozoa, Deuterostomia. Canterbury University Press, Christchurch.

lineatus
Gastropods described in 1928
Gastropods of New Zealand